MediaPro Music is a Romanian record label, part of the Universal Music Group. Launched in 1997, it became an integrated business of the Radio Company PRO in 2006. Between the main label and its sub-labels most music genres are covered, ranging from rock and pop, to dance, Latin, traditional folk, and children music. Moreover, the company is also involved in event planning (concerts, promotion tours, autograph sessions, press conferences) and publishing activities. In 2015, it was confirmed that American corporation Universal Music Group acquired MediaPro Music.

Major artists 
 
 Alessiah
 AMI
 Anda Adam
 Andra
 Anya
 Dan Bittman
 Cargo
 Nicole Cherry
 Loredana Groza
 Holograf
 Lora
 Maia Mălăncuș
 Matteo
 Sore Mihalache
 Marius Moga
 Dorian Popa
 Vunk
 Grasu XXL

Other artists
 
 Low Deep T

Former artists

 Dan Bălan
 Corina
 Alina Eremia
 Antonia Iacobescu
 Lala Band
 Puya
 Adrian Sînă
 Alexandra Stan

References

External links
 
 

1997 establishments in Romania
Record labels established in 1997
Romanian music
Romanian record labels